Liberty High School is a charter school in Globe, Arizona. It was founded in 1996 as the Gila County Transition School and gained its current name in April 2001.  As of July 2014 Liberty HS expanded its services to allow for a 7th and 8th grade program.

References

External links
 www.liberty-high.net

Schools in Gila County, Arizona
Public high schools in Arizona
Educational institutions established in 1996
Charter schools in Arizona
Buildings and structures in Globe, Arizona
1996 establishments in Arizona